Damal District is a district of Ardahan Province of Turkey. Its seat is the town Damal. Its area is 165 km2, and its population is 5,127 (2021).

Composition
There is one municipality in Damal District:
 Damal

There are 7 villages in Damal District:

 Burmadere
 Dereköy
 Eskikılıç
 İkizdere
 Otağlı
 Seyitören
 Tepeköy

References

Districts of Ardahan Province